General Fernando Romeo Lucas García (4 July 1924 – † 27 May 2006) was the 37th President of Guatemala from July 1, 1978 to March 23, 1982. He was elected as Institutional Democratic Party candidate (with the support of the Revolutionary Party). Elections for his presidency were fraud-ridden. During Lucas García's regime, tensions between the radical left and the government increased. The military started to murder political opponents while counterinsurgency measures further terrorized populations of poor civilians.

Franja Transversal del Norte 

The first settler project in the FTN was in Sebol-Chinajá in Alta Verapaz. Sebol, then regarded as a strategic point and route through Cancuén river, which communicated with Petén through the Usumacinta River on the border with Mexico and the only road that existed was a dirt one built by President Lázaro Chacón in 1928.  In 1958, during the government of General Miguel Ydígoras Fuentes the Inter-American Development Bank (IDB) financed infrastructure projects in Sebol.   In 1960, then Army captain Fernando Romeo Lucas Garcia inherited Saquixquib and Punta de Boloncó farms in northeastern Sebol.  In 1963 he bought the farm "San Fernando" El Palmar de Sejux and finally bought the "Sepur" farm near San Fernando.  During those years, Lucas was in the Guatemalan legislature and lobbied in Congress to boost investment in that area of the country.

In those years, the importance of the region was in livestock, exploitation of precious export wood and archaeological wealth.  Timber contracts we granted to multinational companies such as Murphy Pacific Corporation from California, which invested US$30 million for the colonization of southern Petén and Alta Verapaz, and formed the North Impulsadora Company. Colonization of the area was made through a process by which inhospitable areas of the FTN were granted to native peasants.

In 1962, the DGAA became the National Institute of Agrarian Reform (INTA), by Decree 1551 which created the law of Agrarian Transformation.  In 1964, INTA defined the geography of the FTN as the northern part of the departments of Huehuetenango, Quiché, Alta Verapaz and Izabal and that same year priests of the Maryknoll order and the Order of the Sacred Heart began the first process of colonization, along with INTA, carrying settlers from Huehuetenango to the Ixcán sector in Quiché.

The Northern Transversal Strip was officially created during the government of General Carlos Arana Osorio in 1970, by Decree 60-70 in the Congress, for agricultural development.

In 1977, when he stepped down as defense minister to pursue his presidential campaign, general Fernando Romeo Lucas García also happened to hold the position of coordinator of the megaproject of the Northern Transversal Strip, whose main objective was to bring production of to facilitate oil exploitation of that vast land.  By managing this project, Lucas García obtained greater knowledge and interaction with the transnational companies that were in the area, and increased his own personal economic interests in the region, given that his family owned land there and he had commercial relationships with Shenandoah Oil company.

Cuchumaderas case 

In 1977 the municipality of San Mateo Ixtatán had signed a contract with Cuchumaderas company for the "sanitation, reforestation, maintenance and exploitation of forests, based on the urgent need to build and maintain natural resources attacked by the pine beetle."  Upon learning of the negotiation between the municipality and the company, town people forced the authorities to conduct an open meeting and explain the characteristics of the commitment;  each of the members of the municipal corporation gave their account of the negotiation, showing contradictions that led to resignation of the mayor at the very same meeting.  Despite threats received by some residents of San Mateo, they organized a local committee to defend the forest, and started a lawsuit against the company.  As a result, forest extraction processes were stopped.

Cuchumaderas was closely related to the interests of the military leaders who held political power in the 1970s, and spread throughout the defined territory of the FTN; forest wealth of San Mateo Ixtatán made it the target of economic interests in the Northern Transversal Strip.  Ronald Hennessey, pastor of San Mateo Ixtatán during the Guatemala Civil War arrived in October 1980, amid people's fight against the presence of Cuchumaderas and accused in his writings as Cuchumaderas partners the following people: Lucas Garcia, who FTN director when Cuchumaderas was founded, general Otto Spiegler Noriega, who was the Chief of Staff of the Army and later became Minister of Defense under Lucas García;  Jorge Spiegler Noriega, manager of the National Forestry Institute (INAFOR), and then-colonel Rodolfo Lobos Zamora, commander of Military Zone of Quiché.  However, later in the Commercial Register investigations showed that the owner of the company was a different person: it was the engineer Fernando Valle Arizpe, and was well known for being the husband of journalist Irma Flaquer until 1965. Valle Arizpe had developed close relations with senior officials and close members of the government of Lucas García, especially Donaldo Alvarez Ruiz, the Minister of Interior.

During Lucas García government (1 July 1978 – 23 March 1982) the Army Engineers Battalion built the road stretch from Cadenas (Petén / Izabal) to Fray Bartolomé de las Casas.

After the overthrow of Lucas Garcia on 23 March 1982, rose to power a military triumvirate headed by General Efraín Ríos Montt, along with Horacio Maldonado Shaad colonels and Francisco Gordillo.  On 2 June 1982, international journalists conducted an interview with Ríos Montt, who said the following regarding Lucas García government and FTN:

Rise to power 

Due to his seniority in both the military and economic elites in Guatemala, as well as the fact that he spoke perfectly the q'ekchi, one of the Guatemalan indigenous languages, Lucas García was the ideal official candidate for the 1978 elections;  and to further enhance his image, he was paired with the leftist doctor Francisco Villagrán Kramer as running mate.  Villagrán Kramer was a man of recognized democratic trajectory, having participated in the Revolution of 1944, and was linked to the interests of transnational corporations and elites, as he was one of the main advisers of agricultural, industrial and financial chambers of Guatemala.  Despite the democratic facade, the electoral victory was not easy and the establishment had to impose Lucas García, causing further discredit the electoral system -which had already suffered a fraud when General Laugerud was imposed in the 1974 elections.

In 1976 student group called "FRENTE" emerged in the University of San Carlos, which completely swept all student body positions that were up for election that year. FRENTE leaders were mostly members of the Patriotic Workers' Youth, the youth wing of the Guatemalan Labor Party (-Partido Guatemalteco del Trabajo- (PGT), the Guatemalan communist party who had worked in the shadows since it was illegalized in 1954.  Unlike other Marxist organizations in Guatemala at the time, PGT leaders trusted the mass movement to gain power through elections.

FRENTE used its power within the student associations to launch a political campaign for the 1978 university general elections, allied with leftist Faculty members grouped in "University Vanguard".  The alliance was effective and Oliverio Castañeda de León was elected as President of the Student Body and Saúl Osorio Paz as President of the University; plus they had ties with the University workers union (STUSC) thru their PGT connections.  Osorio Paz gave space and support to the student movement and instead of having a conflictive relationship with students, different representations combined to build a higher education institution of higher social projection.  In 1978 the University of San Carlos became one of the sectors with more political weight in Guatemala;  that year the student movement, faculty and University Governing Board -Consejo Superior Universitario- united against the government and were in favor of opening spaces for the neediest sectors.  In order to expand its university extension, the Student Body (AEU) rehabilitated the "Student House" in downtown Guatemala City;  there, they welcomed and supported families of villagers and peasant already sensitized politically.  They also organized groups of workers in the informal trade.

At the beginning of his tenure as President, Saúl Osorio founded the weekly Siete Días en la USAC, which besides reporting on the activities of the University, constantly denounced the violation of human rights, especially the repression against the popular movement. It also told what was happening with revolutionary movements in both Nicaragua and El Salvador .  For a few months, the state university was a united and progressive institution, preparing to confront the State head on.

Now, FRENTE had to face the radical left, represented then by the Student Revolutionary Front "Robin García" (FERG), which emerged during the Labor Day march of 1 May 1978. FERG coordinated several student associations on different colleges within University of San Carlos and public secondary education institutions.  This coordination between legal groups came from the Guerrilla Army of the Poor (EGP), a guerrilla group that had appeared in 1972 and had its headquarters in the oil rich region of northern Quiché department -i.e., the Ixil Triangle of Ixcán, Nebaj and Chajul in Franja Transversal del Norte.  Although not strictly an armed group, FERG sought confrontation with government forces all the time, giving prominence to measures that could actually degenerate into mass violence and paramilitary activity.  Its members were not interested in working within an institutional framework and never asked permission for their public demonstrations or actions.

On 7 March 1978 Lucas Garcia was elected President;  shortly after, on 29 May 1978 -in the late days of General Laugerud García government- in the central square of Panzós, Alta Verapaz, members of the Zacapa Military Zone attacked a peaceful peasant demonstration, killing a lot of people.  The deceased, indigenous peasants who had been summoned in place, were fighting for the legalization of public lands they had occupied for years.  Their struggle faced them directly with investors who wanted to exploit the mineral wealth of the area, particularly oil reserves -by Basic Resources International and Shenandoah Oil- and nickel -EXMIBAL.  The Panzós Massacre caused a stir at the University by the high number of victims and conflicts arising from the exploitation of natural resources by foreign companies.  In 1978 for example, Osorio Paz and other university received death threats for their outspoken opposition to the construction of an inter-oceanic pipeline that would cross the country to facilitate oil exploration. On June 8 the AEU organized a massive protest in downtown Guatemala City where speakers denounced the slaughter of Panzós and expressed their repudiation of Laugerud García regime in stronger terms than ever before.

Presidency (1978–1982) 

Whereas under the previous administration the human rights situation in Guatemala had improved, the regime of Lucas Garcia brought the repression to much the same level observed during the "State of Siege" period under former President Arana Osorio (1970–1974).

Initial protests and early crisis 

On 4 August 1978, barely a month after he took office, high school and university students, along with other popular movement sectors, organized the mass movement's first urban protest of the Lucas García period. The protests, intended as a march against violence, were attended by an estimated 10,000 people. The new Secretary of the Interior under President Lucas García, Donaldo Alvarez Ruiz, promised to break up any protests done without government permission, as the new government had realized that the opposition and Marxist left had a really strong organization by the time the new president was inaugurated. Having refused to ask for permission, the protesters were met by the Pelotón Modelo (Model Platoon) of the National Police. Employing new anti-riot gear donated by the United States Government, Platoon agents surrounded marchers and tear-gassed them. Students were forced to retreat and dozens of people, mostly school-aged adolescents, were hospitalized. This was followed by more protests and death squad killings throughout the later part of the year. In September 1978 a general strike broke out to protest sharp increases in public transportation fares; the government responded harshly, arresting dozens of protesters and injuring many more. However, as a result of the campaign, the government agreed to the protesters' demands, including the establishment of a public transportation subsidy. Fearful that this concession would encourage more protests, the military government, along with state-sponsored paramilitary death squads, generated an unsafe situation for public leaders.

Increased insurgency and state repression: 1980–1982 

The effects of state repression on the population further radicalized individuals within the mass movement and led to increased popular support for the insurgency. In late 1979, the EGP expanded its influence, controlling a large amount of territory in the Ixil Triangle in El Quiche and holding many demonstrations in Nebaj, Chajul and Cotzal. At the same time the EGP was expanding its presence in the Altiplano, a new insurgent movement called the ORPA (Revolutionary Organization of Armed People) made itself known. Composed of local youths and university intellectuals, the ORPA developed out of a movement called the Regional de Occidente, which split from the FAR-PGT in 1971. The ORPA's leader, Rodrigo Asturias (a former activist with the PGT and first-born son of Nobel Prize-winning author Miguel Ángel Asturias), formed the organization after returning from exile in Mexico. ORPA established an operational base in the mountains and rain-forests above the coffee plantations of southwestern Guatemala and in the Atitlan where it enjoyed considerable popular support.  On 18 September 1979, ORPA made its existence publicly known when it occupied the Mujulia coffee farm in the coffee-growing region of the Quezaltenango province to hold a political education meeting with the workers.

Insurgent movements active in the initial phase of the conflict such as the FAR also began to reemerge and prepare for combat. In 1980, guerrilla operations on both the urban and rural fronts greatly intensified, with the insurgency carrying out a number of overt acts of armed propaganda and assassinations of prominent right-wing Guatemalans and landowners. In 1980, armed insurgents assassinated prominent Ixil landowner Enrique Brol, and president of the CACIF (Coordinating Committee of Agricultural, Commercial, Industrial, and Financial Associations) Alberto Habie.  Encouraged by guerrilla advances elsewhere in Central America, the Guatemalan insurgents, especially the EGP, began to quickly expand their influence through a wide geographic area and across different ethnic groups, thus broadening the appeal of the insurgent movement and providing it with a larger popular base. In October 1980, a tripartite alliance was formalized between the EGP, the FAR and the ORPA as a precondition for Cuban-backing.

In early 1981, the insurgency mounted the largest offensive in the country's history. This was followed by an additional offensive towards the end of the year, in which many civilians were forced to participate by the insurgents. Villagers worked with the insurgency to sabotage roads and army establishments, and destroy anything of strategic value to the armed forces. By 1981, an estimated 250,000 to 500,000 members of Guatemala's indigenous community actively supported the insurgency. Guatemalan Army Intelligence (G-2) estimated a minimum 360,000 indigenous supporters of the EGP alone.

Civil war in the city 

On 31 January 1980, Guatemala got worldwide attention when the Spanish Embassy in Guatemala City was burnt down, resulting in 37 deaths, including embassy personnel and high ranked Guatemalan former government officials. A group of native people from El Quiché occupied the embassy in a desperate attempt to bring attention to the issues they were having with the Army in that region of the country, which was rich in oil and had been recently populated as part of the "Franja Transversal del Norte" agricultural program. In the end, thirty seven people died after a fire started within the embassy after the police force tried to occupy the building; after that, Spain broke its diplomatic relationships with Guatemala.

In the months following the Spanish Embassy Fire, the human rights situation continued to deteriorate. The daily number of killings by official and unofficial security forces increased from an average of 20 to 30 in 1979 to a conservative estimate of 30 to 40 daily in 1980. Human rights sources estimated 5,000 Guatemalans were killed by the government for "political reasons" in 1980 alone, making it the worst human rights violator in the hemisphere after El Salvador. In a report titled Guatemala: A Government Program of Political Murder, Amnesty International stated, "Between January and November of 1980, some 3,000 people described by government representatives as "subversives" and "criminals" were either shot on the spot in political assassinations or seized and murdered later; at least 364 others seized in this period have not yet been accounted for."

The repression and excessive force used by the government against the opposition was such that it became source of contention within Lucas Garcia's administration itself. This contention within the government caused Lucas Garcia's Vice President Francisco Villagrán Kramer to resign from his position on September 1, 1980. In his resignation, Kramer cited his disapproval of the government's human rights record as one of the primary reasons for his resignation. He then went into voluntary exile in the United States, taking a position in the Legal Department of the Inter-American Development Bank.

On 5 September 1980 took place a terrorist attack by Ejército Guerrillero de los Pobres (EGP) right in front of the Guatemalan National Palace, then the heardquarters of the Guatemalan government.  The intention was to prevent the Guatemalan people to support a huge demonstration that the government of general Lucas Garcia had prepared for Sunday 7 September 1980.  In the attack, six adults and a little boy died after two bombs inside a vehicle went off.

There was an undetermined number of wounded and heavy material losses, not only from art pieces from the National Palace, but from all the surrounding buildings, particularly in the Lucky Building, which is right across the Presidential Office. Among the deceased was Domingo Sánchez, Secretary of Agriculture drive; Joaquín Díaz y Díaz, car washer; and Amilcar de Paz, security guard.

The attacks against private financial, commercial and agricultural targets increased in the Lucas Garcia years, as the leftist marxist groups saw those institutions as "reactionaries" and "millionaire exploiters" that were collaborating with the genocidal government.  The following is a non-exhaustive list of the terrorist attacks that occurred in Guatemala city and are presented in the UN Commission report:

Despite advances by the insurgency, the insurgency made a series of fatal strategic errors. The successes made by the revolutionary forces in Nicaragua against the Somoza regime combined with the insurgency's own successes against the Lucas government led rebel leaders to falsely conclude that a military equilibrium was being reached in Guatemala, thus the insurgency underestimated the military strength of the government. The insurgency subsequently found itself overwhelmed, and was unable to secure its advances and protect the indigenous civilian population from reprisals by the security forces.

'Operation Ceniza' 

In response to the guerilla offensive in early 1981, the Guatemalan Army began mobilizing for a large-scale rural counter-offensive. The Lucas government instituted a policy of forced recruitment and began organizing a "task-force" model for fighting the insurgency, by which strategic mobile forces were drawn from larger military brigades. To curtail civilian participation in the insurgency and provide greater distinction between "hostile" and compliant communities in the countryside, the army resorted to a series of "civic action" measures. The army under Chief of Staff Benedicto Lucas García (the President's brother) began to search out communities in which to organize and recruit civilians into pro-government paramilitary patrols, who would combat the insurgents and kill their collaborators.

In 1980 and 1981, the United States under Reagan administration delivered $10.5 million worth of Bell 212 and Bell 412 helicopters and $3.2 million worth of military trucks and jeeps to the Guatemalan Army; and in 1981, the Reagan administration also approved a $2 million covert CIA program for Guatemala.

On April 15, 1981, EGP rebels attacked a Guatemalan Army patrol from the village of Cocob near Nebaj, killing five personnel. On April 17, 1981, a reinforced company of Airborne troops was deployed to the village. They discovered fox holes, guerrillas and a hostile population. The local people appeared to fully support the guerrillas. "The soldiers were forced to fire at anything that moved." The army killed 65 civilians, including 34 children, five adolescents, 23 adults and two elderly people.

In July 1981, the armed forces initiated a new phase of counterinsurgency operations under the code-name "Operación Ceniza," or "Operation Ashes," which lasted through March 1982. The purpose of the operation was to "separate and isolate the insurgents from the civilian population." During "Operación Ceniza" some 15,000 troops were deployed on a gradual sweep through the predominantly indigenous Altiplano region, comprising the departments of El Quiché and Huehuetenango.

Large numbers of civilians were killed or displaced in the Guatemalan military's counterinsurgency operations. To alienate the insurgents from their civilian base, the army carried out large-scale mass killing of unarmed civilians, burned villages and crops, and butchered animals, destroying survivors' means of livelihood. Sources with the human rights office of the Catholic Church estimated the death toll from the counterinsurgency in 1981 at 11,000, with most of the victims indigenous peasants of the Guatemalan highlands. Other sources and observers put the death toll due to government repression in 1981 at between 9,000 and 13,500.

As army repression intensified in the countryside, relations between the Guatemalan military establishment and the Lucas Garcia regime worsened. Professionals within the Guatemalan military considered the Lucas approach counterproductive, on grounds that the Lucas government's strategy of military action and systematic terror overlooked the social and ideological causes of the insurgency while radicalizing the civilian population. Additionally, Lucas went against the military's interests by endorsing his defense minister, Angel Anibal Guevara, as a candidate in the March 1982 presidential elections.

Together with the government in neighboring El Salvador, the Lucas Garcia regime was cited as the worst human rights violator in the western hemisphere. The daily number of killings by government forces and officially sanctioned death squads increased from an average of 20 to 30 in 1979 to a conservative estimate of 30 to 40 in 1980. An estimated 5,000 civilians were killed by government forces in Guatemala in 1980. In 1981 the number of killings and assassinations by government forces exceeded 9,000. He was president during Spanish embassy fire in Guatemala City on 31 January 1980, in which 37 people died. His vice president, Francisco Villagrán, resigned on 1 September 1980, citing differences with Lucas and disapproval of the country's worsening human rights situation.

The United States, Israel and Argentina all provided military support to the regime in the form of pipeline aid, sales, credits, training and counterinsurgency advisors. Between FS 1978 and FS 1980, the U.S. provided $8.5 million in military assistance, mostly FMS credit sales, and approximately $1.8 million in export licensing for commercial arms sales, despite a 1977 congressional prohibition on military aid. In 1980 and 1981, the United States also delivered three Bell 212 and six Bell 412 helicopters worth $10.5 million to the army. In June 1981 the Reagan Administration announced a $3.2 million delivery of 150 military trucks and jeeps to the army, justifying these shipments by blaming the guerrillas for the violence perpetrated against civilians.

In its later years, Lucas Garcia's regime was perceived as a threat by the military establishment in Guatemala, as it engaged in actions which compromised the legitimacy of the Guatemalan military with both the populace and within its own ranks, thereby undermining the effectiveness of the counterinsurgency war. In the 1982 elections, Lucas Garcia went against both popular opinion and the military's interests through his endorsement of Angel Anibal Guevara, his own defense minister.

1982 coup d'état and "state of siege" 

On March 23, 1982, junior officers under the command of General Efraín Ríos Montt staged a coup d'état and deposed General Romeo Lucas Garcia. The coup was not supported by any entities within the Lucas government aside from the junior officers involved in engineering the coup. At the time of the coup, the majority of Lucas Garcia's senior officers were reportedly unaware of any previous coup plotting on the part of the junior officers or any other entity. General Lucas was reportedly prepared to resist the coup, and could have easily opposed the coup with his own contingent of troops stationed at the presidential palace, but was coerced into surrendering by being shown his mother and sister held with rifles to their heads.

Prosecution 

In 1999 the Audiencia Nacional of Spain began criminal proceedings for accusations of torture and genocide against the Maya population after a formal petition introduced by Rigoberta Menchú. However, the Venezuelan Supreme Tribunal denied the extradition on 22 June 2005, arguing "...medical reports from García's wife showing that her husband is severely affected by the Alzheimer's disease".

He died in exile in Puerto la Cruz, Venezuela, where he had lived for 12 years with his wife Elsa Cirigliano, suffering from Alzheimers and various other ailments, at the age of 81.

In May 2018, his brother Bendicto Lucas Garcia, who served as his Army Chief of Staff, would receive a 58 year prison sentence after being convicted for a 1981 incident which involved torture and rape.

See also 

 Carlos Manuel Arana Osorio
 Franja Transversal del Norte
 Guatemalan Civil War
 Kjell Eugenio Laugerud Garcia

Notes and references

Notes

References

Bibliography 

 
 
 
 
 
 
 
 
 
 
 
 

 
 
 
 
 
 
 
 
 
 
 
 
 

 
 
 
 
 
 
 
 
 
 Violence and Genocide in Guatemala Yale University

Presidents of Guatemala
People of the Guatemalan Civil War
Institutional Democratic Party politicians
Guatemalan generals
1924 births
2006 deaths
People from Alta Verapaz Department
Deaths from dementia in Venezuela
Deaths from Alzheimer's disease
20th-century Guatemalan people
Guatemalan politicians convicted of crimes
Genocide perpetrators
Defense Ministers of Guatemala